Al-Arba'in fi Ahwal-al-Mahdiyin ('Forty [Hadith] concerning the Mahdis') is a book by Shah Ismail Dehlawi (1779 – 1831) containing forty traditions (Ahadith) pertaining to the appearance of the Imam Mahdi. Shah Ismail Dehlawi was the son of Shah Abdul-Ghani and grandson of Shah Waliullah Dehlawi. Shah Ismail died in action at Balakot fighting against the Sikh Rule in 1831. The book was published some 20 years later from Calcutta in 1851. It appends an apocalyptic ode of Sufi saint Shah Nimatullah Wali (1330-1431) at the end of the book. This 1851 copy of the ode is probably the oldest published copy. According to Professor C. M. Naim of Chicago University, this copy, which he calls Q1, "had long existed, and was undoubtedly copied and shared by thousands of people, its debut in the political discourse of South Asian Muslims occurred near the middle of the 19th century.

Contents
The booklet contains some of the famous Ahadith (saying of the Islamic Prophet Muhammad), a few are discussed below.

Reformer in every Century
On the first page of the book, the author has mentioned the Hadith:

Abu Hurairah narrated from the Holy Prophet, " "Allah shall raise for this Ummah at the head of every century a man who shall renew (or revive) for it its religion.".

This is the basis of the belief of Mujaddids in the past centuries, some times lists are given to that effect.

Death in Ignorance

There is another Hadith on page 7 of the (PDF page):
 "Whoever did not recognize the Imam (Reformer/Guide) of his age, and died (in such a state), he died the death of Ignorance" (page 7)

The Jihad in India
Two ahadith about a prophecy regarding Jihad in India on page 8 of the book:

"Abu Hurairah narrates, The Messenger of Allah gave us the promise of Jihad in India. And if I happen to see that, and offer my life and my wealth in it, it would be the most superior kind of Martyrdom. And if I return alive, I am free of the Fire (of Hell).".[Sunan Al-Nisai, chapter: Jihad in India by Al-Nasa'i (829-915 CE)]

 " Narrated by Thobaan, the Messenger of Allah said,"Two parties of my Ummah have been saved from the Fire (of Hell) by Allah. One, who will wage Jihad in India, and the other, who will accompany the Messiah ".[Sunan Al-Nisai, chapter: Jihad in India by Al-Nasa'i (829-915 CE)]

Khilafah
On page 12, the author mentions a prophecy of Muhammad as narrated by Huzaifa, to the effect that Muhammad's Prophethood shall be followed by a Khilafah (Caliphate) on the principles of Prophethood:

"Prophethood shall remain among you as long as Allah shall will. He will bring about its end and follow it with Khilafat on the precepts of prophethood for as long as He shall will and then bring about its end. A tyrannical monarchy will then follow and will remain as long as Allah shall will and then come to an end. There will follow thereafter monarchial despotism to last as long as Allah shall will and come to an end upon His decree. There will then emerge Khilafat on the precept of Prophethood." The Holy Prophet said no more and became quiet". (Masnad Ahmad ibn Hanbal, Mishkat, Chapter Al-Anzar Wal Tahzir.) (Al-Arba'in fi Ahwal-al-Mahdiyin page 12-13)

Predicting the year of Jesus' Descent

This booklet contains many Ahadith about the Second Coming of Jesus son of Mary from different sources of Ahadith like the Al-Bukhari, the Sahih Muslim, Musnad Ahmad ibn Hanbal, Ibn Hibban and Sunan al-Bayhaqi of Al-Bayhaqi etc. The recurring theme is,  "How  (happy) will you be when the son of Mary (Jesus) descends amongst you".

The author Shah Ismail Shaheed (of Al-Arba'in fi Ahwal-al-Mahdiyin), by drawing a line over the words كيف انتم اذا نزل ابن مريم فيكم ; and using the Gematria or the Abjad numerals has calculated the Value of the phrase, (by adding the Arabic phrase letter-by-letter and getting its cumulative value according to the Abjad numerals), printing over the line the words:  Year 1883 CE and as of Hijri Year 1300 (Hijri).

Ode from Nimatullah
At the end of the book, the Publisher has appended the well known Ode of Nimatullah (1330-1431). The idea of appending these verses of the Great Sufi poet and Mystic of the 14th Century, Nimatullah, appears to be that he thought these verses closely described the same theme which the collection of those 40 Ahadith tend to do, i.e. the appearance of the Mahdi and Messiah. Here are some of these verses, (pages 48–51 of the PDF Copy):

 "I do not say all this by reading the stars: Nay! I relate what God Almighty has told me. Immediately after the passage of twelve hundred years, I see terrible things happening.

I see that a new coin is struck, Whose value is less than it seems.

I see the face of the moon darkened; And the heart of the sun I see wounded.

I envision the joy of meeting the Sweetheart; I envision the rising of the sun of a happy spring.

When his tenure comes to its successful end, I see that he will be succeeded by his illustrious son.

I foresee that aristocrats and nobles; Will become his faithful disciples.

He resembles the Holy Prophet in his appearance; And I find him to be of placid disposition and I see him as the universally accepted leader; The whole world following him faithfully.

I see the name of that illustrious personage written; And I read: Alif, Ha, Mim, and Dal (A H M D)

With his advent I see that the faith of the world shall prosper; And mankind will float upon a wave of good fortune.

I see that he is the Mahdi and the Messiah of the age; And he is the champion in both capacities.

I see the whole world has become like one big city.... "

References

Wahhabism
Sufism in India
Books about Islam
19th-century Indian books
Sufi literature